Sergei Vladimirovich Tyupikov (born 11 May 1988) is a former Russian professional football player.

Club career
He played in the Russian Football National League for FC Nosta Novotroitsk in 2009.

External links
 
 

1988 births
People from Kostroma
Living people
Russian footballers
Association football midfielders
FC Spartak Kostroma players
FC Ufa players
FC Lada-Tolyatti players
FC Zenit-Izhevsk players
FC Torpedo Moscow players
FC Nosta Novotroitsk players
Sportspeople from Kostroma Oblast